Manyiel Riel "Abraham" Majok (born 13 October 1998) is a South Sudanese professional footballer who plays for Cypriot Second Division side Anagennisi Deryneia. Born a South Sudanese refugee in Kenya and raised in Australia, Majok plays for the South Sudan national team.

Club career
He began his career with Spirit FC before joining Mt Druitt Town Rangers. After impressing the coaching staff at the Western Sydney Wanderers during a match against the club, Majok was invited to train with the A-League side before being offered a place with their youth team.

Western Sydney Wanderers
On 21 February 2017, after playing for the club's youth team, Majok made his professional debut for the Western Sydney Wanderers in their AFC Champions League clash against the Urawa Red Diamonds, playing 66 minutes before being replaced by Ryan Griffiths. He followed this up a week later by playing in the Wanderers' clash with Shanghai SIPG, seeing out the final 5 minutes as they were defeated 5–1. He made his first league appearance in a Round 27 clash with Adelaide United at Coopers Stadium, replacing Nicolás Martínez in the 64th minute, the match going on to finish 2–2.

On 19 May 2017, he signed a two-year professional contract with the Wanderers, having previously been on a youth contract. Majok was part of the 2017-18 Y-League championship winning Western Sydney Wanderers Youth team. He played the full 90 minutes as they beat Melbourne City Youth 3–1 in the 2018 Y-League Grand Final on 3 February 2018. He finished the season as top-scorer with nine goals in seven games, collecting the Y-League Golden Boot for his efforts.

Majok made his first appearance of the 2018–19 season as a second-half substitute in a Round 1 clash against Sydney FC in the Sydney Derby, the Wanderers' losing the match 2–0. He scored his first professional goal on 13 January 2019, scoring Western Sydney's 3rd as they were beaten 4–3 by Perth Glory.

Central Coast Mariners
On 21 June 2019, Majok signed a one-year contract with the Central Coast Mariners. He scored his first goal for the club in a late win over Hume in the FFA Cup in September 2019.

He was released by the Mariners in March 2020, and made a total of two A-League appearances for the team.

PAEEK
In July 2020, Majok signed with Cypriot club PAEEK.

International career
After representing Australia at under-23 level, he was selected for the South Sudan national team in September 2019 but declined the call up. He accepted a call up from South Sudan in June 2021, however he didn't take part in the game against Jordan due to COVID-19 pandemic. He debuted with South Sudan in 1–0 2023 Africa Cup of Nations qualification win over Djibouti on 27 March 2022.

Honours
Western Sydney Wanderers
Y-League: 2017–18

PAEEK
Cypriot Second Division: 2020–21

Individual
Y-League Golden Boot: 2017–18

References

External links
Cypriot football stats

1998 births
Living people
South Sudanese footballers
South Sudan international footballers
Australian soccer players
Australia youth international soccer players
Western Sydney Wanderers FC players
Central Coast Mariners FC players
PAEEK players
A-League Men players
Association football forwards
Australian people of South Sudanese descent
Sportspeople of South Sudanese descent
Sudanese emigrants to Australia
South Sudanese emigrants to Australia
Expatriate soccer players in South Africa
Expatriate footballers in Cyprus